The 1924 Centre Praying Colonels football team represented Centre College in the 1924 college football season. The Praying Colonels scored 119 points while allowing 20 points and finished 5–1–1, giving Alabama its only loss of the season; Alabama did not lose another game until 1927.

Quarterback Herb Covington was named to the 1924 College Football All-America Team.

Schedule

References

Centre
Centre Colonels football seasons
Centre Praying Colonels football